Rosedale is a historic home located near Middletown, New Castle County, Delaware.  It was built about 1801, and consists of a two-story, brick rectangular main block with a two-story rear ell. Also attached is a three-bay, one-story wing constructed of a wood siding and two wings added to the rear (south) between 1960 and 1965. It has a center hall plan.  It has a slate-covered gable roof, interior end chimneys, and a front entrance with fanlight.  Also on the property are a contributing hay barn, barn, and mash furnace.

It was listed on the National Register of Historic Places in 1985.

References

Houses on the National Register of Historic Places in Delaware
Houses completed in 1801
Houses in New Castle County, Delaware
National Register of Historic Places in New Castle County, Delaware